Sir Alexander Abel Smith  (18 September 1904 – 17 April 1980) was a British Army officer and merchant banker.

Life
A member of the Smith banking family, he was the son of Francis Abel Smith (died 1908) of Wilford House, Nottinghamshire; and was the younger brother of Henry Abel Smith. He was educated at Eton College and Magdalen College, Oxford. After university he worked in JP Morgan in New York.

Abel Smith served in Anti-Aircraft Command in World War II, and then joined the 
British Army Staff, Washington. He was an honorary Brigadier in the British Army. From about 1946 he was a partner in J. Henry Schroder Wagg. He was Chairman of the Pressed Steel Company from 1955 to 1965 and of Provident Mutual Life Assurance Association Ltd. from 1966 to 1973.

Family
Abel Smith married in 1936 Elizabeth Morgan, who died in 1948. Secondly, he was the second husband of Henriette, Lady Abel Smith, Lady-in-Waiting to Queen Elizabeth II.

Notes

External links
Generals of World War II

1904 births
1980 deaths
Knights Bachelor
Knights Commander of the Royal Victorian Order
English justices of the peace
British bankers
British Army brigadiers of World War II
Recipients of the Legion of Merit
Knights First Class of the Order of the Dannebrog
People educated at Eton College
Alumni of Magdalen College, Oxford
Smith and Carington family
Royal Artillery soldiers
Royal Artillery officers
Royal Army Ordnance Corps officers